The Starkenburg Observatory is an astronomical observatory in Heppenheim, Germany. It was founded in 1970, and currently has about 150 members.

The observatory was the venue for the 1997 and 2003 meetings of the European Radio Astronomy Congress. The amateur astronomers at the observatory have discovered more than 40 asteroids and participate in the tracking of near earth asteroids. 

The instruments at the observatory consists of:
 0.45-meter newtonian
 0.356-meter Schmidt–Cassegrain telescope
 0.30-meter newtonian
 0.20-meter refractor
 0.15-meter refractor
 0.10-meter refractor
 0.19-meter flat-field camera
 0.14-meter Schmidt camera

The two main-belt asteroids 6864 Starkenburg and 14080 Heppenheim were named in honor of the medieval castle, the adjunct observatory and the nearby town Heppenheim, respectively.

List of discovered minor planets 

As of 2016, IAU's Minor Planet Center (MPC) credits the discovery of 52 numbered minor planets directly to the observatory (group discovery) including 47 discoveries to "Starkenburg" (1997–2009), and 5 discoveries to "Heppenheim" (1997–2002), for which no apparent distinction can be made.

For the table below, the mentioned astronomers may or may not be credited directly with the discovery by the MPC. Instead, the discovery site/observatory, "Starkenburg" or "Heppenheim", may be the sole credited discoverer, as for 18610 Arthurdent (discovered at Heppenheim by Starkenburg).

See also 
 List of astronomical observatories
 Sankt Andreasberg Observatory
 Sonneberg Observatory
 Stuttgart Observatory

References

External links 
 Starkenburg-Sternwarte e.V. 

Astronomical observatories in Germany
Buildings and structures in Bergstraße (district)

Minor-planet discovering observatories